An electronic-warfare aircraft is a military aircraft equipped for electronic warfare (EW), that is, degrading the effectiveness of enemy radar and radio systems by using radar jamming and deception methods.

In 1943, British Avro Lancaster aircraft were equipped with chaff in order to blind enemy air defence radars. They were supplemented by specially-equipped aircraft flown by No. 100 Group RAF, which operated modified Halifaxes, Liberators and Fortresses carrying various jammers such as Carpet, Airborne Cigar, Mandrel, Jostle, and Piperack.

List of electronic-warfare aircraft
Examples of modern aircraft designed or modified for EW include:
 
 Antonov An-12BK-PPS (Soviet Union)
 Antonov An-26REP (Soviet Union)
 Boeing EA-18G Growler (United States)
 Denel TP1 Oryx EW (South Africa)
 Chengdu J-10D (China)
 Douglas C-47TP EW (South Africa)
 Douglas EA-3 Skywarrior (United States)
 Douglas EB-66 Destroyer (United States)
 Douglas EF-10B Skyknight (United States)
 Embraer R-99 (Brazil)
 General Dynamics/Grumman EF-111A Raven (United States)
 IAI 202B Arava (Israel)
 Ilyushin Il-22PP (Soviet Union) / (Russia)
 Kawasaki EC-1 (Japan)
Kawasaki RC-2 (Japan)
 Lockheed EC-130H Compass Call (United States)
 Mil Mi-8PP (Soviet Union)
 Northrop Grumman EA-6B Prowler (United States)
 Tornado ECR (Germany / Italy)
 Shaanxi Y-8EW (China)
 Shaanxi Y-8-GX1 (China)
 Shaanxi Y-9-GX11 (China)
 Shenyang J-15D (China)
 Shenyang J-16D (China)
 Sukhoi Su-24MP (Soviet Union)
 Tupolev Tu-16RM-2 (Soviet Union)
 Yakovlev Yak-28PP (Soviet Union)

References

Electronic warfare aircraft